In Euclidean geometry, the Apollonius point is a triangle center designated as X(181) in Clark Kimberling's Encyclopedia of Triangle Centers (ETC). It is defined as the point of concurrence of the three line segments joining each vertex of the triangle to the points of tangency formed by the opposing excircle and a larger circle that is tangent to all three excircles.

In the literature, the term "Apollonius points" has  also been used to refer to the isodynamic points of a triangle.  This usage could also be justified on the ground that the isodynamic points are related to the three Apollonian circles associated with a triangle.

The solution of the Apollonius problem has been known for centuries. But the Apollonius point was first noted in 1987.

Definition

The Apollonius point of a triangle is defined as follows.

Let  be any given triangle. Let the excircles of  opposite to the vertices  be  respectively. Let  be the circle which touches the three excircles  such that the three excircles are within . Let  be the points of contact of the circle  with the three excircles. The lines  are concurrent.

The Apollonius problem is the problem of constructing a circle tangent to three given circles in a plane. In general, there are eight circles touching three given circles. The circle  referred to in the above definition is one of these eight circles touching the three excircles of triangle .

Trilinear coordinates
The trilinear coordinates of the Apollonius point are

References

See also
Apollonius' theorem
Apollonius of Perga (262–190 BC), geometer and astronomer
Apollonius problem
Apollonian circles
Isodynamic point of a triangle
Triangle centers